Giovanni Orsini or John Orsini may refer to:

John I Orsini (d. 1317), count palatine of Cephalonia and Zakynthos
John II Orsini, despot of Epirus (1323–1335)
Giovanni Battista Orsini, grand master of the Hospitallers (1467–1476)
Giambattista Orsini (d. 1503), cardinal

See also
Giovanni Gaetano Orsini (disambiguation)
Orsini family